The 1999 Dartmouth Big Green football team represented Dartmouth College in the 1999 NCAA Division I-AA football season. The Big Green were led by eighth-year head coach John Lyons and played their home games at Memorial Field in Hanover, New Hampshire. The Big Green finished the season 2–8 overall and 2–5 in Ivy League play, to finish in sixth place. Team captains were Reggie Belhomme, Caleb Moore, Thomas Reusser and Kyle Schroeder.

Previous season
The Big Green finished the 1998 season with a 2–8 record overall and 1–6 in Ivy League play to finish tied for seventh place.

Schedule

Roster

Team leaders

Passing

References 

Dartmouth
Dartmouth Big Green football seasons
1999 in sports in New Hampshire